Yanaul (Yañawıl) is a rural locality (a village) in Novoyanzigitovsky Selsoviet, Krasnokamsky District, Bashkortostan, Russia. The population was 51 as of 2010.

Geography 
It is located 46 km from Nikolo-Beryozovka and 3 km from Novy Yanzigit.

References 

Rural localities in Krasnokamsky District